CHI Health Center Omaha is an arena and convention center in the central United States, located in the North Downtown neighborhood of Omaha, Nebraska.

The complex opened on September 20, 2003 as Qwest Center Omaha, and adopted the name of CenturyLink Center Omaha on July 15, 2011, as part of a  buyout of Qwest by CenturyLink (formerly CenturyTel). In July 2018, CHI Health bought the naming rights to the arena under a 20-year agreement worth $23.6 million, and the arena was renamed CHI Health Center Omaha effective September 1, that year.

The arena hosts basketball and hockey games, professional wrestling events, concerts, and the annual shareholders' meeting of Omaha-based conglomerate Berkshire Hathaway, usually held on the first Saturday of May.

The arena's primary tenant is the Creighton University men's basketball team. Through the 2014–15 NCAA ice hockey season, the Omaha Mavericks men's ice hockey team, representing the University of Nebraska Omaha, was also a primary tenant, but the Mavericks moved to the new Baxter Arena effective with the 2015–16 season.

History
In 2000, Omaha voters approved a $216 million bond issue to build a new convention center and arena; the remainder of the $291 million project was provided by private organizations and individuals. The facility design was led by architectural firm DLR Group.  Naming rights to the arena were purchased by Qwest.

Qwest Center Omaha opened in September 2003 with an initial seating capacity of 17,000 for concerts, 15,500 for basketball, and 14,700 for hockey. In 2006, a $5.7-million expansion of the arena increased capacity by approximately 1,500 seats.

The Qwest Center displaced the 1954 Omaha Civic Auditorium as the city's premier indoor arena.  The venerable Ak-Sar-Ben Coliseum closed in 2002 and was demolished in 2005.

Notable events
The arena has hosted games in the NCAA Division I men's basketball tournament four times: first- and second-round games in 2008, 2012, and 2015; and Midwest Regional games (Sweet Sixteen and Elite Eight) in 2018. The arena was planned to host the 2020 tournament's first- and second-round games, but the tournament was cancelled due to the COVID-19 pandemic. The arena also hosted the 2010 NCAA Division I Wrestling Championships, and was home to the WWE Judgment Day 2008 pay-per-view, as well as other events from WWE. The arena has also five championship boxing cards, all involving Omaha native Terence Crawford as he wanted to defend his titles in front of a home crowd. His first bout at the arena, against Yuriorkis Gamboa for the WBO lightweight belt in 2014, was the first championship fight in Nebraska since the Joe Frazier-Ron Stander bout in 1971.

The arena hosts the Nebraska School Activities Association state wrestling championships each February. The tournament moved to what was then Qwest Center Omaha in 2006 after 30 years at Lincoln's Bob Devaney Sports Center.

Summer Olympics Swimming Trials
The center hosted the nationally televised USA Swimming Summer Olympics trials in 2008, 2012, 2016, and 2021. The center does not have permanent swimming facilities and a team of 200 workers with oversight by Myrtha Pools  (which specializes in the construction and dismantling of large-scale temporary pools) constructed them in two weeks.

The 2008 event averaged more than 12,000 spectators each night.

A storm damaged a portion of the roof known as The Hat on June 27, 2008.  There was no structural damage, but the damage caused water to pour into parts of the Qwest Center, flowed down two sets of arena steps and onto the deck of the competition pool for the USA Swimming Summer Olympic Trials.  The schedule for the trials went on as planned.

The pools were dismantled after the event and moved to other cities for permanent installation with the 2008 pool going to the Poseidon Swimming facility in Richmond, Virginia, the 2012 pool going to Charles River Aquatics in Boston, Massachusetts, the 2016 pool going to the Hulbert Aquatic Facility in West Fargo, North Dakota (West Fargo bought the pool via a local group of swim enthusiasts called UP Aquatics for $900,000). and the 2021 pool going to a group in Minneapolis, Minnesota that plans to convert an abandoned book bindery in the city's Near North neighborhood into an Olympic-caliber aquatic center.

In 2016, the arena hosted the Kellogg's Tour of Gymnastics Champions.

Rodeo
From 2006 to 2009, the Professional Bull Riders hosted a Built Ford Tough Series event at the arena, and from 2014 to 2016 they hosted a Velocity Tour event. The PBR returned to host an Unleash the Beast Series event on May 1 and 2, 2021, for their first Premier Series event in 12 years.

Construction
In 2001, construction began on the new convention center and arena, known as the "Omaha Arena and Convention Center". Architectural firm DLR Group spearheaded the design, while The Thornton-Tomasetti Group served as structural engineer. M–E Engineers, Inc. was the services engineer and a local company, Kiewit Corporation, led general construction. A groundbreaking ceremony was held on March 1, 2001. The venue was completed in August 2003, with an official opening on September 24, 2003.

In 2006, the MCEA funded a project to expand the arena and add an additional 1,472 seats to the upper bowl. The project also included adding restroom facilities and concession stands, as well as updating aesthetics, mechanical systems, and emergency exits. The cost of the project was $6 million. Construction began in May and was completed September 8, 2006.

In 2009, the center saw another renovation with work enveloping the entire building. The $6 million project included new carpet, wallpaper, reupholstered arena seating, and a new scoreboard.

Facilities

CHI Health Omaha Convention Center
The convention center has placed Omaha on the convention map since opening in 2003. The center features three exhibit halls, four ballrooms and over 15 meeting rooms. 
Exhibit Hall:  The main exhibition room which can be divided into three separate rooms (Halls A-C) depending on configuration. The combined rooms can house over 1,000 or a conference seating more than 16,000 guests. 
Peter Kiewit Grand Ballroom:  Named after the founder of the Kiewit Corporation, is the biggest ballroom in the facility. Based on configuration, it can be divided into 3 small ballrooms (Ballroom A-C) or 2 large rooms (North and South). The room is primarily used for graduation ceremonies, charity galas and business conferences. 
Junior Ballroom: This intimate space was designed for private events such as weddings, receptions, banquets and cocktail parties up to 1,000 guests. 
CHI Health Center Arena
The arena is the busiest venue of the complex. Built in 2001, the arena was meant to replace the aging Omaha Civic Auditorium and demolished Ak-Sar-Ben Coliseum. It is the largest arena in the state, seating over 18,000. It contains 32 luxury suites and over a thousand club seats. The arena hosts shows of all genres, including: concerts, family shows, sports, rodeos and circuses. The arena opened September 12, 2003, with a private concert by Grand Funk Railroad. The first official event was the "River City Roundup Fair and Festival", held at both facilities. 
Hilton Omaha
This hotel features 600 guest rooms, 15 meeting rooms, and two ballrooms, an on-site restaurant, and skywalk connection to the convention center.  The $71 million property opened April 2004 and has achieved the AAA four-diamond rating for ten years.

Naming
Qwest Center Omaha 
CenturyLink Center Omaha 
CHI Health Center Omaha

Records and milestones
Top 10 Largest Home Crowds at CHI Health Center Omaha, Creighton History

On the evening of March 8, 2014, the largest crowd to attend a Creighton University basketball game occurred when 18,868 fans witnessed the Creighton men's team defeat Providence on Doug McDermott's career-high senior night performance of 45 points.

On January 13, 2012, the largest crowd to ever watch a hockey game in Nebraska occurred when 16,138 fans attended the game between the University of Nebraska at Omaha and Minnesota-Duluth.

The CHI Health Center holds several NCAA attendance records, particularly in women's college volleyball. The three largest crowds to attend NCAA tournament matches were for Nebraska Cornhuskers games at the venue. The highest attendance for any volleyball match in the United States, whether for men or women, occurred on December 19, 2015 when 17,561 fans watched the 2015 NCAA Division I Women's Volleyball Championship game between Nebraska and former conference rival Texas. This broke a record set two days earlier, when Nebraska defeated another former conference rival, Kansas, in the national semifinals in front of a crowd of 17,551. In turn, this match broke an attendance record set in 2008, when 17,340 fans watched the NCAA semifinal match between Penn State and Nebraska.

Gallery

See also
 Omaha Civic Auditorium – (defunct)
 Baxter Arena
 Mid-America Center
 Rosenblatt Stadium – (defunct)
 Ak-Sar-Ben – (defunct)
 TD Ameritrade Park
 Morrison Stadium
 Ralston Arena
 Werner Park
 List of NCAA Division I basketball arenas

References

External links
CHI Health Center Omaha Official Website
 CenturyLink Center Omaha – GoCreighton.com

2003 establishments in Nebraska
Lumen Technologies
Basketball venues in Nebraska
College basketball venues in the United States
College ice hockey venues in the United States
Convention centers in Nebraska
Creighton Bluejays basketball venues
Event venues established in 2003
Gymnastics venues in the United States
Indoor arenas in Nebraska
Indoor ice hockey venues in the United States
Music venues in Omaha, Nebraska
Omaha Mavericks men's ice hockey
Sports venues in Omaha, Nebraska
Sports venues completed in 2003
Swimming venues in the United States
Wrestling venues in the United States